Feardorcha O'Farrelly (fl. 1736) was an Irish poet.

O'Farrelly appears to have been born in the late 17th century. His father was John O'Farrelly of Mullagh, County Cavan, a farmer, historian and poet. Nothing appears to be known of his mother.

O'Farrelly studied for the Catholic priesthood, but was prevented from been ordained by some obscure circumstance. He became a farmer in Mullagh, enjoying local fame as a poet, and gaining the acquaintance of Turlough Carolan and Charles McCabe. His patrons were the Mortimer family of Cloghwallybeg. Only five poems can now be attributed to him, surviving in manuscript form.

See also
Ó Fearghail

References
 Dictionary of Irish Biography, p. 456-57, Cambridge, 2010.

Irish poets
Irish-language poets
18th-century Irish people
People from County Cavan